Dendroleon pantherinus is a species of neuropteran insects of the antlion (Myrmeleontidae) family.

Taxonomy 
The species has been described in 1787 by the Danish entomologist Johan Christian Fabricius, with the original combination Myrmeleon pantherinum. The genus Dendroleon is created by Friedrich Moritz Brauer in 1866, with D. pantherinus as type species.

References 

Myrmeleontidae
Insects described in 1787